This list describes educational institutions that explicitly associate themselves with Calvinism.

Seminaries
Tertiary institutions that study theology as their primary focus include:
Andrewes Hall
Calvin Theological Seminary
Canadian Reformed Theological Seminary
Columbia Theological Seminary
Covenant Baptist Theological Seminary
Covenant Theological Seminary
Cranmer Theological House
Cummins Memorial Theological Seminary
Erskine Theological Seminary
Evangelical Theological College of Wales
Farel Reformed Theological Seminary
Geneva Reformed Seminary
Greenville Presbyterian Theological Seminary
Knox Theological Seminary
Louisville Presbyterian Theological Seminary
The Master's Seminary
McCormick Theological Seminary
Mid-America Reformed Seminary
Midwestern Baptist Theological Seminary
New Brunswick Theological Seminary
Northwest Theological Seminary
Pittsburgh Theological Seminary
Puritan Reformed Theological Seminary
Protestant Reformed Theological School
Princeton Theological Seminary
Reformed Episcopal Seminary
Reformed Presbyterian Theological Seminary
Reformed Theological Seminary
Sangre de Cristo Seminary
The Southern Baptist Theological Seminary
Toronto Baptist Seminary and Bible College
Union Presbyterian Seminary
Western Theological Seminary
Westminster Theological Seminary
Westminster Seminary California
Whitefield Theological Seminary

Colleges and universities
Tertiary institutions that do not study theology as their primary focus include:
Belhaven University
Bethlehem College & Seminary
Calvin University
Central College
Covenant College
Dordt University
Erskine College
Geneva College
Grove City College
Hope College
The King's College (New York City)
The King's University (Edmonton)
Kuyper College
The Master's University
New Saint Andrews College
Northwestern College
Providence Christian College
Reformation Bible College
The Log College & Seminary
Trinity Christian College
Ursinus College
Whitefield College

Secondary schools

Philadelphia Montgomery Christian Academy (Philadelphia, Pennsylvania)
Arrowhead Christian Academy (Redlands, California)
Calvin Christian High School (Grandville, Michigan)
Central Minnesota Christian High School (Prinsburg, Minnesota)
Central Valley Christian Schools (Visalia, California)
Chicago Christian High School (Palos Heights, Illinois)
Covenant Christian High School (Grand Rapids, Michigan)
Covenant Christian Academy (Westminster, California)
Eastern Christian High School (North Haledon, New Jersey)
Grand Rapids Christian High School (Grand Rapids, Michigan)
Guido de Bres Christian High School (Hamilton, Ontario, Canada)
Hamilton Christian High School (Hamilton, Ontario, Canada)
Holland Christian High School (Holland, Michigan)
Illiana Christian High School (Lansing, Illinois)
Kalamazoo Christian High School (Kalamazoo, Michigan)
Lansing Christian High School (Lansing, Michigan)
London District Christian Secondary School (London, Ontario, Canada)
Los Angeles Baptist High School (North Hills, California)
Manhattan Christian High School (Churchill, Montana)
Mars Hill Academy
(Mason, Ohio) 
Netherlands Reformed Christian School (Pompton Plains, New Jersey)
Northern Michigan Christian High School (McBain, Michigan)
Plymouth Christian High School (Grand Rapids, Michigan)
Rehoboth Christian School Rehoboth, New Mexico
Ripon Christian High School (Ripon, California)
South Christian High School (Grand Rapids, Michigan)
Southwest Minnesota Christian High School (Edgerton, Minnesota)
Timothy Christian High School (Elmhurst, Illinois)
Toronto District Christian High School (Toronto, Ontario, Canada)
Unity Christian High School (Hudsonville, Michigan)
Valley Christian High School (Cerritos, California)
Western Michigan Christian High School (Muskegon, Michigan)
Westminster Academy (Fort Lauderdale, Florida)
Zion Christian High School (Byron Center, Michigan)

See also
Association of Presbyterian Colleges and Universities
List of Lutheran colleges and universities in the United States

References

 
Cal